This is a list of countries by number of Academy Award for Best International Feature Film (known as Best Foreign Language Film before 2020), a table showing the total number of submissions, nominations, and awards of the Academy Award for Best International Feature Film received by each country. It follows Academy convention by not grouping the tally of extinct countries with that of their successor states. , at least one film has been submitted by 134 countries. Of this number, 63 countries have received a nomination, with 28 countries ultimately winning the Oscar.

Academy Awards for Best International Feature Film tally by country

Notes
Submitted films include disqualified entries, except those resubmitted, so as to not count twice.

Submissions by year

See also
 Academy Award for Best International Feature Film
 List of Academy Award winners and nominees for Best International Feature Film
 List of Academy Award–winning foreign-language films (in categories other than the International Feature Film category itself)

References
General

Specific

Academy Award for Best International Feature Film

Academy Awards